Cradley Heath is a town in the Rowley Regis area of the Metropolitan Borough of Sandwell, West Midlands, England approximately  north-west of Halesowen,  south of Dudley and  west of central Birmingham. Cradley Heath is often confused with the neighbouring Halesowen district of Cradley from which it is separated by the River Stour; both are in the Black Country but have long been administered by different local authorities, and until 1966 were in separate counties.

Cradley Heath is one of several towns in central England still recognisable from their early 20th-century appearance. Many of the shops and houses in the High Street are still standing after 100 years, though some were demolished in the mid-2000s to make way for a bypass, to ease congestion in the town centre.

History

Cradley Heath was originally an area of heathland between Cradley, Netherton, and Old Hill, in the Staffordshire parish of Rowley Regis. The residents of Cradley had grazing rights, subject to an annual payment to the Lord of the Manor. As on other commons in the Black Country, cottages were built encroaching on the heath. These were occupied by nailmakers, amongst other industries.

One landmark in the growth of Cradley Heath as a distinct community was the creation of Cradley Heath Baptist Church, in December 1833. This was the first Christian Church meeting in Cradley Heath, and has the distinction of having the first Afro-Caribbean minister in Britain, Rev. George Cosens, in 1837.

Mining
Cradley Heath and the surrounding area lie on the South Staffordshire coalfield. Ordnance Survey maps surveyed in 1882 show the town to be surrounded by collieries. Deaths from mining accidents were not unknown. In December 1839, four men were crushed when a coal mine roof collapsed underground; between two and three thousand mourners attended the funeral procession. In October 1844, ten men including the 'butty' plus a boy aged 12 died in a coal mine explosion. Two horses working underground were also killed. Several ironstone miners working below the coal seam managed to escape, but a further three working horses could not be rescued. At the inquest it was reported that the mine had been inspected hours earlier, tested for sulphur gas and declared safe. Verdicts of accidental death were given.

Industry
From the introduction of machine-based nail-making around 1830, Cradley Heath developed two prolific industries – chainmaking and nailmaking – which would remain strong for decades afterwards.

Among the metallurgical companies that were active in the area was the British Iron Company and its successor, the New British Iron Company, who operated a vast iron and steel works at Corngreaves from 1825 to 1894. The works expanded to include rivet and boiler shops and chain works; continuing under other owners until 1912. It was only during the 1980s recession that the iron-working industries based in Cradley Heath began to decline.

Chain-making developed both as a cottage industry where outworkers produced smaller size chains in forges at the rear of their homes — women accounted for two-thirds of these workers — and in factories where both smaller and larger size chains were made. Much of the factory output of larger chain was for ship anchors. In 1903, Samuel Woodhouse & Sons at the Eagle Works on Corngreaves Road became the first British manufacturer of electrically welded chain. Over the summer of 1910, around one thousand local women led and organised by Mary Macarthur of the National Federation of Women Workers, and supported by the Chain Makers' and Strikers' Association were involved in a ten-week-long Chainmakers' Strike. The women successfully campaigned for the implementation of the minimum rate of pay set by the Chain Trade Board  — effectively doubling their wages. The dispute ended on the 22 October 1910 when the last of the employers agreed to pay the minimum wage. By 1934 there were 68 chain-works and chain-shops in Cradley Heath; almost a third of the total for Great Britain. Numbers declined after the Second World War but some outworking continued into the 1950s. The papers of the Cradley Heath Chainmakers' Trade Union are housed at the University of Birmingham Special Collections.

The Workers' Institute, which stood in Lower High Street for almost 100 years, was rebuilt at the Black Country Living Museum in 2006, after being dismantled to make way for a bypass.

Media
Cradley Heath for a short while had a newspaper published in the town. The Cradley Heath and Stourbridge Observer was launched on 26 March 1864. The seven-column, four-page broadsheet was published by Thomas Homer of Five-Ways, Cradley Heath each Saturday. On Saturday, June 4, 1864 the masthead was changed to The Observer; Stourbridge, Cradley Heath, Halesowen and District Chronicle. The newspaper covered not only local news but national and international affairs too. A publisher based in High Street, Stourbridge had taken over by  October 1864. The newspaper's title was changed to The Stourbridge Observer - Cradley Heath, Halesowen and District Chronicle on 6 October, 1866 and published under that name until 30 June 1888.

The Royal Electric Theatre stood on Bank Street from 1913; it closed in 1988 and was demolished in 2006 to make way for a Tesco supermarket. The Majestic Cinema on Cradley Road opened in 1933 and was designed by Dudley architects, Webb and Gray in Art Deco style. The cinema closed 30 years later and like many others was converted into a bingo hall, which in turn closed in 2000. The Majestic had room for 1,500 people, stained glass windows with heraldic patterns at balcony level and a Christie organ. The appearance of the building has become rather shabby; the shop units are empty and it faces an uncertain future.

Cradley Heath today

Cradley Heath High Street is marked by two road junctions, Four-Ways at the east end, and Five-Ways at the west end.  Four-Ways is the most altered by the new bypass, running parallel to the High Street, with the Tesco store at this end. Cradley Heath remains a traditional shopping centre, offering an alternative to modern malls. It has two market halls and numerous privately owned shops and businesses. The old Market Hall has been in Cradley Heath for over 100 years. The Black Country Bugle newspaper was originally based in Cradley Heath but is now situated at the newly built Dudley Archives; the newspaper was set up by Derek Beasley, former chairman of Halesowen Harriers, which focuses on local history and culture of the Black Country and often features articles and poems written in the Black Country dialect.

Cradley Heath has two large municipal parks, Haden Hill Park, which contains Haden Hall and Haden Old Hall (the latter with Tudor origins) which was the ancestral home of the Haden family and the Mary McArthur Memorial Gardens (known locally as Lomie Town park).

An enterprise zone was developed in the deindustrialised eastern part of the town, near the border with Rowley Regis.

The Old Bank Building on Upper High Street which was built in 1908 for the United Counties Bank of Cradley Heath has kept its original place even with the new road layout with the modernisation of Cradley Heath. In 1973 the Old Bank Building became part of Sandwell Insurance and Sandwell Accountancy Services (SAS).

Cradley Heath High Street has not changed much since the subsidence in 1914 and the dip in the high street following the subsidence is very prominent and can be seen still today.

Geography
A part of the West Midlands conurbation, Cradley Heath is located in the south of the Sandwell Metropolitan Borough, approximately 8 miles west of Birmingham. It is situated in a low-lying area of the Black Country, south of the limestone ridge that runs through the area, with the River Stour forming the southern boundary with Cradley, and the Mousesweet Brook (a tributary of the Stour) forming the northern border, between Quarry Bank and Netherton. Both also act as the boundary between the metropolitan boroughs of Sandwell and Dudley.

Neighbourhoods
Lomey Town — a road, now renamed Lower High Street, and area between Five Ways and Cradley Heath railway station. An  infant's school built in 1876, but later demolished, was so named. Historical references.
Newtown — area north-east of the town centre, extending over the Mousesweet Brook into Dudley Wood. 
Plant's Green — area north-east of Four Ways redeveloped in the 1970s. The name appears to have fallen out of use. 
Surfeit Hill — residential area on rising ground east of Corngreaves Road. 
Timbertree Academy is the local primary school. A small shopping parade is on Valley Road. An hourly daytime bus service runs Monday to Saturday to the Merry Hill Shopping Centre via Cradley Heath and to  Halesowen. An Ordnance Survey map published in 1904 shows Timbertree Colliery linked by a tramway to the large Corngreave Works formerly owned by the New British Iron Company.

Governance 

Cradley Heath is part of the Cradley Heath and Old Hill ward which is represented by three councillors on Sandwell Borough Council.

Cradley Heath was formerly a part of the Rowley Regis Municipal Borough, with the council house situated in Old Hill. Following the abolition of the borough in 1966, until 1974, Cradley Heath was part of the County Borough of Warley, and therefore part of Worcestershire.

The council house remained in use as offices by Sandwell Council until 2012, when it was demolished to make way for the construction of a new fire station.

Education
Sandwell Council is the local education authority for Cradley Heath, and is responsible for maintaining all the schools in the area.

The local secondary school, Ormiston Forge Academy, is situated in Wright's Lane, Old Hill, and has served the area since the 1960s. Other nearby secondary schools are located outside the town in the Dudley Borough, in neighbouring Netherton and Halesowen. There are several primary schools in Cradley Heath. Corngreaves Academy on Plant Street claims to be the oldest school in Sandwell Borough, with roots back to 1848-49 and the British Iron Company.

Places of worship

The nearest Anglican churches are St John's on St Anne's/Dudley Wood Road and Holy Trinity, Old Hill. Four-Ways Baptist Church stands on Corngreaves Road. The Cradley Heath Central Mosque on Plant Street opened in 2016. The A number of other Methodist buildings in the area, mostly around Old Hill, amalgamated to build a new building at Lawrence Lane.  There is also a Wesleyan Reform Union Chapel, St James', relocated from Cradley Heath to Old Hill because of the bypass. The Kingdom Hall of Jehovah's Witnesses can be found opposite the Holy Trinity Church in Old Hill.

There are several Strict and Particular Baptist Churches, including Spring Meadow and Station Road, both in Old Hill.

Former
St Luke's stood at Four-Ways, Cradley Heath from 1847 until its demolition in 2016. The churchyard remains.
Grainger's Lane Methodist Church closed in 2004, and was later demolished.

Transport

Cradley Heath railway station and the adjacent bus station form the Cradley Heath Interchange. The station is on the Birmingham to Worcester line, with regular services between the two. Bus services run to Birmingham, Dudley, Halesowen, the Merry Hill Shopping Centre, Walsall and West Bromwich.

Sport
The town was home to the Cradley Heath Heathens speedway team, which participated in British speedway from 1947 until 1995. The club's heyday was in the 1980s when World Champion riders such as Erik Gundersen and Bruce Penhall were team members. The speedway track was in Dudley Wood, just north of the town. The stadium was closed and the land redeveloped for housing in the mid-1990s, but is remembered in the names Stadium Drive and Racemeadow Crescent. 

Professional darts player Jason Lowe was born and raised in Cradley Heath.

Parks and leisure facilities
The main parkland is Haden Hill Park, the former home of the Haden family and now in the care of Sandwell MBC.  Alongside Haden Hill House are Haden Hill Leisure Centre, housing a swimming pool and other facilities, and Old Hill Cricket Club. 

Bearmore Playing Field off Bearmore Road is laid out on the site of Bearmore Colliery. 

Codsall Coppice Local Nature Reserve between Codsall Road and Trejon Road comprises  of mature, mainly oak woodland. 

The Cradley Heath Liberal Club has substantial facilities on Upper High Street, just east of Four-Ways.  The Regis Restaurant, Old Hill, was for many years a community hall but the future has been in doubt after Sandwell MBC found it uneconomic.

Voices In Harmony, a local choir, originated in Cradley Heath as "Sandwell Community Choir" to perform Handel's The Messiah in October 1997 as part of the BT "Voices For Hospices" event.

It is host to an annual festival over the last few years called Cradley Women Chainmakers' Festival.

Notes

References

External links
Cradley Heath and Old Hill Ward on ONS site
Sandwell MBC web site
River Stour
Cradley Heath Amateur Operatic Society
Black Country Images
CradleyLinks

Towns in the West Midlands (county)
Areas of Sandwell
Rowley Regis